Hugh Mitchell  (August 5, 1890 – September 10, 1967) was an American football player and coach. He served as the head football coach at the United States Military Academy in 1918, compiling a record of 1–0.

Head coaching record

References

1890 births
1967 deaths
Army Black Knights football coaches
Army Black Knights football players